Justin Boland, also known as J Boogie is a DJ, music producer, radio host, music director and music curator from San Francisco with over 25 years of experience in the music industry.

He is the Head of Hip-Hop and R&B Programming at Pandora Media. As a curator, he's responsible for the Hip-Hop and R&B libraries, editorial curation and programming Pandora's genre stations and Project Management for Pandora's programming team. J Boogie's experience in radio, clubs and the recording studio have provided opportunities for him to work at Beats Music, Pulselocker, Spinner.com/AOL Music, Amoeba Music, KUSF and more.

He is signed to the Om Records label, and has three full-length albums as well as several DJ mix CDs. He has also been featured on several compilations and remix projects.

His style includes a mixture of downtempo, hip-hop, funk, dub, soul, afrobeats, Latin, dancehall, and electronic.

He was the co-creator of the radio show Beatsauce, along with DJs Raw B, and Wisdom on KUSF, which was awarded "Best hip-hop show" by citysearch.com, the SF Bay Guardian, and the SF Weekly. He was also one of the long time residents at Dub Mission, a weekly reggae/roots party in San Francisco at the Elbo Room.

J Boogie's Dubtronic Science
His band J Boogie's Dubtronic Science, features himself DJing with FX and drum machines, plus a few other frequent contributors. They play a mix of styles and feature members of Jazz Mafia on horns, an Afro Latin percussion percussionist, Aima the Dreamer, Deuce Eclipse and Rich Armstrong on vocals, and sometimes special guests such as Zion I or Lyrics Born. Although Dubtronic Science uses production techniques popularized in dub music, the album does not fall under that genre.

DJ work
J Boogie has been DJing since 1991. He started on the radio in college radio at KUSF. When DJing, he integrates various techniques and musical genres including dub, soul, hip–hop, reggae, funk, Latin, afrobeats, bhangra, dancehall, disco, electro and house.

J Boogie DJs around the world at places like APT, Turntables on the Hudson, Deep Space NYC, 18th Street Lounge, Halo, Temple Bar, Afro Funke, Root Down, Firecracker, The Do Over and Deep LA. He has also been on tour with Widespread Panic, Bassnectar and Spearhead, and has opened for George Clinton & Parliament Funkadelic, Mark Farina, Louie Vega, DJ Krush, Kruder & Dorfmeister, Breakestra, RJD2, PPP, and Nickodemus.

He has also performed at the music festivals Bumbershoot, Bonnaroo, SXSW, WMC, Harmony Fest, Earthdance, High Sierra, Power to the Peaceful and Burning Man.

J Boogie's self-titled debut album was released in 2003, featuring artists like Goapele, Gina Rene, People Under The Stairs, Capital A and Tony Moses. His next release on Om Records, Live in the Mix, was a mix CD featuring two new original songs, "You're a Murdera" featuring Deuce Eclipse and Zion I, and "Purple Perpendicular Phonics", featuring P.E.A.C.E. and Raashan Ahmad.

His third release on Om, Soul Vibrations, features The Rebirth, Rich Medina, Lyrics Born, Ohmega Watts, Zion I, Crown City Rockers, Jennifer Johns, Deuce Eclipse, Capitol A, The Mamaz, Jazz Mafia, Lunar Heights, Jrod Indigo, Tony Moses and more.

J Boogie has also released several mixtapes and remixes. His has remixed DJ Vadim, Alice Russell, Miguel Migs, Karsh Kale, The Rebirth, Zeph & Azeem, Mark Farina, Zion I, Goapele and Soulstice. His mix CDs are Leftism 1 & 2 with Sake One, In the Mood I & II, Universal B Breaks, Electro Soul, Live in the Bedroom, and Live on the Dancefloor. He has been featured on compilations like Mark Farina's Mushroom Jazz 5 & 6, the Om Lounge series, and Ubiquity compilations and remix projects.

He has remixed/dubbed:
 Mark Farina
 Asiah and DJ Tonk
 Romanowski
 Soulstice
 Colossal
 DJ Sun ("Para")

He has been remixed/dubbed by:
 King Kooba
 Kaskade
 People Under The Stairs

He has collaborated with / featured:
 Talib Kweli
 Mark Farina
 People Under The Stairs
 Deuce Eclipse
 Zion I
 Goapele
 Capitol A
 Raashan Ahmad Morris
 Omega y su Mambo Violento
 P.E.A.C.E.
 Gina Rene
 Mike Biggz
 Lunar Heights

Discography

12" singles:
 "Try Me"
 "Purple Perpendicular Phonics"
 "You're the Murdera" (B-side)
 "Inferno"

Albums:
 J Boogie's Dubtronic Science (2003)
 Live in the Mix (2005)
 Soul Vibrations (2008)
 Soul Vibrations: Dub Remixes (2009), digital release only

References 

1973 births
Living people
American record producers